Gopinath Muthukad (born 10 April 1964) is an Indian magician and motivational speaker from Kerala. He employs magic as a medium to convey his messages to public. Muthukad founded the world's first magic academy, The Academy of Magical Sciences, and first magic museum, Magic Planet at Thiruvananthapuram.

In 1995, he became the first magician in the world to perform an escape act in the style of Harry Houdini's act of 1904. In the same year, he was awarded the Kerala Sangeetha Nataka Akademi award. Muthukad is the winner of the International Merlin Award instituted by the International Magicians' Society.

Muthukad is the first Keralite to be honoured as the celebrity supporter by the UN agency UNICEF, for promoting child right activities in Kerala. Muthukad has announced his retirement from professional magic shows and now he has focused his area of work mainly on empowering the marginalized differently-abled community. In 2022, he was honoured with Kerala Sree Award, third highest civilian award given by the Government of Kerala.

Early life 

Muthukad was born on 10 April 1964 in Kavalamukkatta, a small village near Nilambur to Kunhunni Nair and Devaki Amma. Even at an early age, he showed a great interest in magic having heard stories about Vazhakkunnam who was one of the great magicians in Kerala. At the age of 10, he was caught performing magic in class by a teacher who then encouraged him to hold his first show at his school. Muthukad says this was the turning point in his life. Over the years his determination to pursue magic as a career grew stronger despite stiff opposition from his father.

After graduating in mathematics from N. S. S. College, Manjeri  he joined Law College, Bangalore but later dropped out and left his Nilambur home for Thiruvananthapuram to pursue his passion in magic. Although his early years as a magician were full of struggles, he began to be noticed for his unique styles of presenting magic. He has appeared in more than 8,000 stages in India and abroad, and has given a new vision and mission to the art of magic.

Endeavors

Magic Academy
The Academy of Magical Sciences, popularly known as Magic Academy, was established in the year 1996, in Thiruvananthapuram, Kerala. The founder patron was Late Malayattoor Ramakrishnan and after it was late Jnanpith awardee O. N. V. Kurup. And now the torch of leadership is handled by acclaimed film director, Shri. Adoor Gopalakrishnan.

It was established under the Cultural and Charitable institutions act, for the upliftment and promotion of the magic art, moreover in using the art to fight against all kinds of irrational beliefs, superstitions, violence and other evil practices existing in our society.

National Voyages
Under the leadership of Magic Academy, Gopinath Muthukad has undertaken four national voyages from Kanyakumari to Kashmir which includes Vismay Bharata Yatra (2002), Gandhi Mantra (2005), Vismay Swaraj Yatra (2007) and Mission India (2010) and many state level voyages. All these Yatras has been undertaken with the motives to foster a sense of national integration, to spread the vital messages of Mahatma Gandhi, Communal harmony, to counter the violence and terrorism existing in our nation, to spread awareness against drug and alcohol abuse etc.

Magic Planet
Magic Planet situated at KINFRA Film and Video Park, Kazhakkoottam, Thiruvananthapuram was established with an objective to provide a permanent rehabilitation hub for street magicians who are at the verge of complete wipe out from the main phase our society due lack of platforms to display their rare skills. Moreover it was designed to impart wonders and immense possibilities of magical art to the common public which includes the domestic tourists and foreigners visiting the state. The venture was opened to public in 2014. Currently the institution is supporting more than 200 more artistes for the daily functioning and their day today needs.

Mpower

In 2017, Magic Academy with the support of Kerala State Social Security Mission conducted ‘Anuyatra’ campaign to empower the differently abled children and bring them to the mainstream of the society. 23 selected children undergone magic training and formed a magic team named ‘MPower’. Inspired by the highly successful performance of the children, Magic Academy decided to establish a permanent performance platform for them -Mpower centre with the support of UNICEF and Kerala Social Security Mission. This centre trains and develops their talents, while ensuring life skills to make them more self-aware and confident. It is for the first time in the world, a permanent magical performance centre has been opened for the specially abled talents. Today, the centre gives training to specially abled children in a mode that they can become breadwinners for their family. Recently, the Mpower team stepped into INDIA BOOK OF RECORDS for their unique performance.

Different Art Centre

The success of Mpower paved the path in the formation of a Comprehensive Art Centre at Kazhakkuttom, Thiruvananthapuram for differently abled children to explore their artistic talents and promote the overall development of differently abled community. The centre aims to empower these children by recognizing and sharpening their raw talents through special and appropriate methods. The appreciation from the audience, reaching the centre, increases a sense of confidence and better self-awareness in all participants. The Centre was opened in 2019. Different Art Centre will act as a window of opportunity in identifying, training and refining the basic talents of differently abled children in various art forms.

UNICEF
Gopinath Muthukad has been conferred "Celebrity UNICEF Supporter"  status to join the efforts of the UN agency in improving condition and status of children in the state. Muthukad is the first Keralite and the first magician to receive the honour. He was selected for his credibility and ability to communicate critical messages on child rights to a large number of people, particularly mothers, caregivers and youth. He joins hands with UNICEF to provide all children with opportunities to survive, develop and reach their full potential to the benefit of the sustained growth and stability of countries and a global standard of human rights for all.

Election Commission of India

Muthukad has been designated as State Icon for Kerala by the Election Commission of India, for his activities on creating awareness and motivating the masses to participate in the electoral process. Through his magical shows, he was able to create awareness on the importance of democracy and the need to participate in the electoral processes. He was the first Keralite selected for this honour. He worked as volunteer in the North East State of India where people is reluctant to cooperate in the election process.

Awards and achievements

Kerala Sangeetha Nataka Akademi Award in 1995
Prathibha Pranamam Honour by Kerala state government in 2000
Merlin Award from International Magician's Society in 2011
Celebrity Advocate title from UNICEF for promoting child rights in 2016
Kerala Icon by Election Commission of India in 2016
Rashtriya Aavishkar Abhiyan Ambassador in 2016
Kerala Sangeetha Nataka Akademi Fellowship in 2018
Leader of the 21st Century finalist by San Francisco University 2019
Brand Ambassador for Kerala State Commission for Protection of Child Rights in 2020
Kerala Sree instituted by Government of Kerala, 2022

Books

•   Magic: History, Basics (a book depicting the basics of the art of magic)

•	Vazhakunnam Stories (a book depicting the stories of the great legendary magician Vazhakkunnam who was a master to Muthukad).

•	Math-Magic (a book on mathematical magic)

•	Easy-to-do magic tricks (a book illustrating easy magic tricks for children)

•	Ee kadhayilumundoru Magic

•	Ormakalude Manthrika Sparsham (Autobiography)

•	Magic Lamp

•	India- Ente Pranaya Vismayam (travel book)

•	India- My spellbound love (travel book)

Television shows

Personal life 

Muthukad is married to Kavitha and the couple has a son, Vismay Muthukad. He is settled with his family in Thiruvananthapuram.

References

External links
 Gopinath Muthukad Official site
 Magician Muthukad performs an act of redemption after a decade
 Weekly Newsletter from Magic Academy, India
 International Merlin Award 2011
 'Stop SAD' Mission
 Abracadabra!
 All about Magician Philip (student of Magician Muthukad)
 Online data bank on magicians of India
 Indian Magicians Web Site
 Gopinath Muthukad's Page on IM
 Gopinath Muthukad's Page on WoM

Indian magicians
Malayali people
1964 births
Living people
People from Malappuram district
Kerala Sree Award Winners
Recipients of the Kerala Sangeetha Nataka Akademi Fellowship
Recipients of the Kerala Sangeetha Nataka Akademi Award